GPS puck has two meanings.

It is a term for the antenna on GPS navigation devices, which receives GPS signals from GPS satellites.  The early antennas were round, and thus had the appearance of a hockey puck. The GPS puck is commonly used in the boating electronic industry. The reason the boating industry uses the GPS puck is because they give a true signal of direction so you can tell where you're at and where you're going on the water or land.

Alternatively, a GPS puck is a full puck-sized GPS system (receiver and antenna).

Advantages
The GPS puck has many advantages associated with it. The GPS puck can operate anywhere in the world. The GPS puck can also function under any weather or climate conditions but it might not be as accurate in poor conditions. The main advantage it has is the ability to give its exact position and heading direction. Another advantage the GPS puck gives is the ability to link and connect an external device like a Fishfinder to show its positioning on a map. The GPS puck is a crucial component to have because the built-in mapping in a fishfinder does not have the capabilities to give defined coordinates and positioning like the GPS puck. The GPS puck could save your life as well because the government can track the device to find out where you are located if ever in danger.

Disadvantages
The GPS puck system has to have power to operate. This is a disadvantage because the loss of power can cause you to lose direction and not make it to your destination. Also when using the GPS puck the signals might be affected by mountains or tall trees. Another disadvantage a GPS puck could cause is the ability for someone else to be tracking the device.

Fishing Uses

Navigation and mapping have grown substantially in the fishing industry. Almost all lakes and oceans have detailed maps available. Detailed maps show underwater structures like shallow places and underwater humps/shoals, contour line indicates these features. Every fishing boat made in today's time has got one or twofishfinder that shows underwater structure and fish, they also come with built-in maps. Fishfinders have the ability to mark a specific location on the map. This is where the GPS puck comes into perspective. The GPS puck gives fishermen the ability to keep their boats on the exact location of the point marked. It also gives fishermen the upper hand because they now know exactly where to place their boats to catch fish.

References

Global Positioning System